Sir Thomas Heneage PC (1532 – 17 October 1595) was an English politician and courtier at the court of Elizabeth I.

Early and personal life
Thomas Heneage the Younger was born at Copt Hall, Epping, Essex, the son of Sir Robert Heneage and Lucy Buckton. Robert and his brother Thomas were members of Henry VIII's Privy Chamber, the latter holding the important office of Groom of the Stool. Thomas Heneage was educated at Queens' College, Cambridge.

In 1554 Heneage married Anne Poyntz, daughter of Sir Nicholas Poyntz and Joan Berkeley. Their only daughter Elizabeth married Sir Moyle Finch, Bt and was created Countess of Winchilsea. Following Anne's death in 1593, he married Mary Browne, Countess of Southampton on 2 May 1594; this marriage was childless.

Career
Heneage was elected Member of Parliament for Stamford in 1553, before sitting for Arundel from 1559. He was then elected for Boston in 1563 but chose to sit for Lincolnshire. He was again returned for Lincolnshire in 1571 and 1572, and for Essex in 1584, 1586, 1589, and 1593.

He became a courtier under Elizabeth I. He became a Gentleman of the Privy Chamber about 1565 at around that time, she flirted with him, making her favourite, Robert Dudley, 1st Earl of Leicester, jealous. However, Heneage had so far been on good terms with Leicester and the Earl, in his 1587 will, called him "my good old friend". In 1570 he rose to Treasurer of the Queen's Privy Chamber, and was knighted in 1577. In 1586, Heneage was sent by the Queen to the Netherlands. He was to convey to the States General her strong protest of the Earl of Leicester having accepted their offer of the title Governor-General. Heneage read out publicly Elizabeth's letters of disapproval before the Dutch politicians, Leicester, their new Governor General, having to stand nearby. He became Vice-Chamberlain of the Household and was sworn of the Privy Council of England in 1587, before being appointed Chancellor of the Duchy of Lancaster in 1590.

He was also a friend of Francis Walsingham. and a colleague of Sir Christopher Hatton acting as an intermediary between the Queen and Hatton regarding rivalry between Hatton and Sir Walter Raleigh for the Queen's affections. [8]

Heneage died on 17 October 1595 and was buried in Old St Paul's Cathedral. His grave and monument were destroyed in the Great Fire of London in 1666. A modern monument in the crypt of the rebuilt cathedral lists him as one of the important graves lost.

Notes

 Deacon. M. p32 etc.

References
Chamberlin, Frederick: Elizabeth and Leycester Dodd, Mead & Co. 1939
Hutchinson, Robert: Elizabeth's Spymaster: Francis Walsingham and the Secret War that saved England Phoenix 2007 
Wilson, Derek: Sweet Robin: A Biography of Robert Dudley Earl of Leicester 1533–1588 Hamish Hamilton 1981 
Deacon, Malcolm: The Courtier and the Queen: Sir Christopher Hatton & Elizabeth I Park Lane Publishing 2008 

Alumni of Queens' College, Cambridge
1532 births
1595 deaths
Chancellors of the Duchy of Lancaster
Knights Bachelor
Members of the Privy Council of England
People from Epping
English MPs 1553 (Mary I)
English MPs 1559
English MPs 1563–1567
English MPs 1571
English MPs 1572–1583
English MPs 1584–1585
English MPs 1586–1587
English MPs 1589
English MPs 1593
Gentlemen of the Privy Chamber
Burials at St Paul's Cathedral
Court of Henry VIII